Orly J. Punzalan (September 9, 1935 – January 6, 2005) was a Filipino radio-TV personality in the Philippines.

Personal life
In 1967, he was married to actress and broadcaster, Helen Vela (1946–1992). They had four children, including Pastor Paolo Punzalan (Senior Pastor of Victory Fort Bonifacio) and Princess Punzalan. The couple separated in 1973 and later divorced. He later married a woman named Pilar.

Career
Punzalan was once the station manager of Radio Veritas. He also hosted a program called Touching Lives in the same station. The broadcaster was also once the president of the IBC 13 Philippine television network. Punzalan is considered as one of the veterans in Philippine communication arts and acted as a consultant for several radio and television stations.

In February 2000, he received the Edsa People Power Freedom Award.

In his later years, Punzalan taught broadcasting in institutions such as the Colegio de San Juan Letran and the University of Perpetual Help-Rizal.

Death
He died of cardiac arrest on January 6, 2005, at the National Kidney and Transplant Institute. He was 70. He was buried at the Manila Memorial Park in Parañaque City. Alongside him lays his wife Helen Vela (who died in 1992).

References

1935 births
2005 deaths
Filipino radio personalities
Filipino television personalities
Burials at the Manila Memorial Park – Sucat
21st-century Filipino educators